Scopula quadrilineata, commonly known as the four-lined wave, is a species of moth in the family Geometridae. It is found in North America, from Nova Scotia to Saskatchewan and bordering areas of the United States, south in the east to North Carolina. It has also been recorded in British Columbia.

The wingspan is 20–22 mm. The forewings are white with three or four faint yellowish transverse lines and pale gray speckling. The hindwings are similar in pattern and color.

References

Moths described in 1876
quadrilineata
Moths of North America